Personal Identifiers (PID) are a subset of personally identifiable information (PII) data elements, which identify an individual and can permit another person to “assume” that individual's identity without their knowledge or consent. 
	
Identifiers can be sensitive and non-sensitive, depending on whether it is a direct identifier that is uniquely associated with a person or a quasi-identifier that is not unique. A quasi-identifier cannot pin down an individual alone - it has to be combined with other identifiers.

Examples of PID

Privately issued ID credentials
Benefit plan participation number
Private health care authorization, access, or identification number

Transactional financial account numbers
Bank account number
Credit or debit card account number
Personal identification number (PIN)
taxpayer identification number

Biometric identifiers
Fingerprint or voiceprint
Iris or retina scans
DNA

Health or medical information
National Health certificate number

Electronic identification credentials
Digital certificates
Passwords

Full Date of Birth

Month, day and year

European-defined sensitive data
Treated as PID globally, not just for citizens of the EU
Racial or ethnic origin
Political opinions
Religious or philosophical beliefs
Trade-union membership
Health or sex life
Offenses, criminal convictions, or security measures
Proceedings from crimes or offenses

See also
National identification number
Identity score

References

Personal life
Identity documents
Privacy